Darsena is a Genoa Metro station, located on Via Antonio Gramsci close to Piazza della Darsena, in Genoa, Italy. Darsena translates to dock in English. The station serves the old port area of the city.

The station has a very large, bright mezzanine.  There are two exits: one is in the northerly sidewalk, the other is towards the quayside, under the elevated Strada Aldo Moro.

The station officially opened on 25 July 2003 but functional operation began on 7 August.

References

External links

Genoa Metro stations
Railway stations opened in 2003
2003 establishments in Italy
Railway stations in Italy opened in the 21st century